William Henry Harrison High School (HHS) is a four-year public high school in Tippecanoe County, Indiana near West Lafayette. The school is part of the Tippecanoe School Corporation.

History
William Henry Harrison Highschool was established in 1967 when a school consolidation project merged Klondike, Battle Ground, and East Tipp High Schools; its first academic year was 1970-1971. HHS is named for William Henry Harrison, 9th president of the United States, who led US forces in the Battle of Tippecanoe in nearby Battle Ground, Indiana.

Academics
Harrison High School performs in a variety of academic competitions, including Quiz Bowl, National Science Bowl, Spell Bowl, Indiana Math League, Academic Super Bowl, Foreign Language Quiz Bowl, and the FIRST Robotics Competition.

Demographics
The demographic breakdown of the 1,979 students enrolled for the 2018-2019 school year was:
Male - 52.2%
Female - 47.8%
Native American/Alaskan - 0.4%
Asian - 2.5%
Black - 4.3%
Hispanic - 11.2%
White - 77.5%
Multiracial - 4.1%

37.3% of the students were eligible for free or reduced-cost lunch.

Athletics
Harrison High School's Raiders compete in the North Central Conference. School colors are burnt orange and navy blue. The following Indiana High School Athletic Association (IHSAA) sanctioned sports were offered for 2019-20:

Baseball (boys) 
State champion - 1995
Basketball (girls and boys) 
Cross country (girls and boys) 
Football (boys) 
State champion - 1992
Golf (girls and boys) 
Gymnastics (girls) 
Soccer (girls and boys) 
Boys state champion - 2017
Softball (girls) 
Swimming and diving (girls and boys) 
Tennis (girls and boys) 
Track and field (girls and boys) 
Girls state champion - 1974
Unified track and field (coed)
Volleyball (girls) 
Wrestling (coed)

Arts
Harrison has over 450 students enrolled in eight bands (Symphonic, Wind Orchestra, Chamber Winds, 3 Jazz, Pep, and Militia Marching Band) and five choirs (Beginning, Concert, Myriads, Chamber, & Jazz). They routinely engage in various music festivals, domestic travel, and international student exchanges.

Harrison also has a theater program in which students perform musicals in the spring as well as a play in the fall.

Notable alumni

Eric Bruntlett, Major League Baseball (MLB) player
Todd Dunwoody, MLB outfielder
Amanda Elmore, rower
Lila Ibrahim, Chief Operating Officer of DeepMind
Josh Lindblom, MLB pitcher
Ian Murdock, software engineer and founder of the Debian project
Erik Sabel, MLB pitcher
Julia Scheeres, author and journalist whose memoir Jesus Land relates her experiences at Harrison
Byron Schenkman, harpsichordist
Emily Sirota, member of the Colorado House of Representatives and wife of David Sirota
Josh Whitman, University of Illinois athletic director

Notable faculty

William Bartelt, historian

See also
 List of high schools in Indiana

References

External links
 William Henry Harrison High School
 Tippecanoe School Corporation

Public high schools in Indiana
West Lafayette, Indiana
Educational institutions established in 1967
Schools in Tippecanoe County, Indiana
1967 establishments in Indiana